Municipal election for Birgunj took place on 13 May 2022, with all 162 positions up for election across 32 wards. The electorate elected a mayor, a deputy mayor, 32 ward chairs and 128 ward members. An indirect election will also be held to elect five female members and an additional three female members from the Dalit and minority community to the municipal executive.

Background 

Birgunj was established as a municipality in 1953. The metropolitan city was formed in 2017 after incorporating neighboring village development committees into Birgunj sub-metropolitan city. Electors in each ward elect a ward chair and four ward members, out of which two must be female and one of the two must belong to the Dalit community.

In the previous election, Vijay Kumar Sarawagi from Federal Socialist Forum was elected as the first mayor of the metropolitan city.

Candidates

Exit polls

Mayoral results

Ward results 

|-
! colspan="2" style="text-align:centre;" | Party
! Chairman
! Members
|-
| style="background-color:;" |
| style="text-align:left;" |People's Socialist Party, Nepal
| style="text-align:center;" | 13
| style="text-align:center;" | 56
|-
| style="background-color:;" |
| style="text-align:left;" |Nepali Congress
| style="text-align:center;" | 9
| style="text-align:center;" | 37
|-
| style="background-color:;" |
| style="text-align:left;" |CPN (Unified Marxist–Leninist)
| style="text-align:center;" | 8
| style="text-align:center;" | 32
|-
| style="background-color:#00aa44;" |
| style="text-align:left;" |Loktantrik Samajwadi Party, Nepal
| style="text-align:center;" | 2
| style="text-align:center;" | 3
|-
! colspan="2" style="text-align:right;" | Total
! 32
! 128
|}

Summary of results by ward

Results for municipal executive election 
The municipal executive consists of the mayor, who is also the chair of the municipal executive, the deputy mayor and ward chairs from each ward. The members of the municipal assembly will elect five female members and three members from the Dalit and minority community to the municipal executive.

Municipal Assembly composition

Results

Municipal Executive composition

See also 

 2022 Nepalese local elections

References 

Birgunj